The Women's lightweight single sculls event at the 2010 South American Games was held over March 21 at 10:00.

Medalists

Records

Results

References
Final

Lightweight Single Scull W